Ifraim Alija (Serbo-Croat: Ifrajim Alija) (born 30 August 1985 in SFR Yugoslavia) is a Swiss footballer who plays for FC Uzwil.

He played his only match in Super League 2003–04 season.

References

External links
 

1985 births
Living people
Place of birth missing (living people)
Association football central defenders
Kosovan footballers
Swiss men's footballers
FC Wil players
FC Gossau players
FC St. Gallen players
FC Kreuzlingen players
Swiss Super League players
Kosovan expatriate footballers
Expatriate footballers in Switzerland
Kosovan expatriate sportspeople in Switzerland